Tully may refer to:

People 
 Tully (surname), origins and history of the Tully surname in Ireland
 List of people with surname Tully
 List of people with given name Tully
 Marcus Tullius Cicero, or Cicero, a Roman philosopher, politician, lawyer and orator

Places

Australia 
 Tully (Parish), New South Wales, a civil parish of Yungnulgra County
 Tully, Queensland, a town in the Cassowary Coast Region
 Tully Falls, Queensland
 Tully River, Queensland, Australia

France 
 Tully, Somme, a commune in France

Ireland 
Tully, a civil parish in Dublin, Republic of Ireland
Tully, County Galway, a village on the Renvyle Peninsula
Tully, County Kildare, a civil parish in County Kildare, Republic of Ireland
Tully, County Offaly, a townland spanning Ardnurcher and Kilmanaghan civil parishes, barony of Kilcoursey, County Offaly, Republic of Ireland

United Kingdom 
 Tully, County Fermanagh, a townland in County Fermanagh, Northern Ireland
 Tully, County Londonderry, a townland in County Londonderry, Northern Ireland
 Tully, County Tyrone, a townland in County Tyrone, Northern Ireland
 Tully Castle in County Fermanagh, Northern Ireland

United States 
Tully (town), New York, United States
Tully (village), New York
Tully Lake, Massachusetts, a reservoir and flood control project
Tully Mountain, Massachusetts, United States
Tully Township, Marion County, Ohio
Tully Township, Van Wert County, Ohio
Tully Trail, a hiking trail in Massachusetts

Arts, entertainment, and media 
 Tully (2000 film), a 2000 American film
 Tully (2018 film), a 2018 American film
 Tully (band), an Australian progressive rock band 1967-72
 House Tully, one of the seven great houses in George R.R. Martin's fantasy series A Song of Ice and Fire and its adaptations

Other uses
 Tullamore Dew, often spelled Tullamore D.E.W. or referred to as "Tully", a brand of Irish whiskey produced by William Grant & Sons
 Tully Monster, a fossil
 Tully–Fisher relation, an astronomical device
 Tully's Coffee, a corporation

See also
 Tull (disambiguation)